John Phillip Price (born 21 October 1966) is a Welsh professional golfer who plays on the European Senior Tour. He won three European Tour events between 1994 and 2003 and played in the 2002 Ryder Cup.

Early life
Price was born in 1966 in Pontypridd. He currently resides in Newport.

Professional golfer
Price turned professional in 1989 and qualified for membership of the European Tour for the 1991 season via the 1990 Qualifying School. His best year on the tour came in 2000, when he finished eighth on the Order of Merit. His other top ten placing came in 2003, when he was tenth.

He has three tournament wins on the European Tour. In 2005 he played on the U.S.-based PGA Tour, but he did not do well enough to retain his card. He has featured in the top 50 of the Official World Golf Ranking.

Price has made one appearance in the Ryder Cup, playing for the winning European team of 2002. He beat Phil Mickelson in the final day's singles to secure an invaluable point and an historic victory.

Price played in the 2016 Senior Italian Open which started on his 50th birthday and finished second, a stroke behind Stephen Dodd. In 2017 he had his first win on the European Senior Tour, winning the WINSTONgolf Senior Open. He won the 2019 Staysure PGA Seniors Championship for his second European Senior Tour win.

Professional wins (7)

European Tour wins (3)

Other wins (1)
1993 Welsh Professional Championship

European Senior Tour wins (3)

European Senior Tour playoff record (0–2)

Results in major championships

WD = Withdrew
CUT = missed the halfway cut
"T" indicates a tie for a place.

Summary

Most consecutive cuts made – 2 (three times)
Longest streak of top-10s – 1

Results in World Golf Championships

1Cancelled due to 9/11

QF, R16, R32, R64 = Round in which player lost in match play
"T" = Tied
NT = No tournament

Team appearances
Amateur
Jacques Léglise Trophy (representing Great Britain & Ireland): 1984 (winners)
European Amateur Team Championship (representing Wales): 1987, 1989

Professional
Alfred Dunhill Cup (representing Wales): 1991, 1996, 2000
World Cup (representing Wales): 1991, 1994, 1995, 1997, 1998, 1999, 2000, 2001, 2004
Seve Trophy (representing Great Britain & Ireland): 2000, 2003 (winners)
Ryder Cup (representing Europe): 2002 (winners)

See also
2004 PGA Tour Qualifying School graduates

References

External links

Welsh male golfers
European Tour golfers
PGA Tour golfers
European Senior Tour golfers
PGA Tour Champions golfers
Ryder Cup competitors for Europe
Sportspeople from Newport, Wales
1966 births
Living people